Phan Rí Cửa is a township of Tuy Phong District, Bình Thuận Province.

On November 21, 2019, the township annexed the rural commune of Hòa Phú.

References

Populated places in Bình Thuận province
Townships in Vietnam